The Detroit Tigers are a Major League Baseball (MLB) franchise based in Detroit, Michigan. They play in the American League Central division. Since the institution of MLB's Rule 4 Draft, the Tigers have selected 65 players in the first round. Officially known as the "First-Year Player Draft", the Rule 4 Draft is MLB's primary mechanism for assigning players from high schools, colleges, and other amateur clubs to its franchises. The draft order is determined based on the previous season's standings, with the team possessing the worst record receiving the first pick. In addition, teams which lost free agents in the previous off-season may be awarded compensatory or supplementary picks.

Of the 65 players picked in the first round by Detroit, 32 have been pitchers, the most of any position; 25 of these were right-handed, while five were left-handed. Twelve outfielders were selected, while five shortstops, five catchers, four third basemen, three first basemen, and two second baseman were taken as well. One additional player, Lance Parrish (1974), was drafted as an infielder but ultimately spent the majority of his Major League career at catcher. Thirteen of the players came from high schools or universities in the state of California, followed by Texas with ten players. The Tigers have also drafted five players from their home state of Michigan.

Two of the Tigers' first-round picks have won championships with the franchise. Parrish and Kirk Gibson (1978) won a World Series title on the 1984 championship team. Justin Verlander (2004) is the only first-round pick of the Tigers to win the Rookie of the Year Award, taking the honor in 2006. Two Tigers first-round picks have won the Cy Young Award, both in the American League; Verlander won the award in 2011 with the Tigers and 2007 pick Rick Porcello won in 2016 with the Boston Red Sox. None of their first-round picks have been elected to the Baseball Hall of Fame. Justin Verlander became the first player who was drafted in the 1st round of the draft to win the Most Valuable Player award while with the Tigers in the 2011 season. Gibson won the MVP award in his first year with the Los Angeles Dodgers in 1988.

The Tigers have made ten selections in the supplemental round of the draft and have made the first overall selection three times (1997, 2018, and 2020). They have also had eight compensatory picks since the institution of the First-Year Player Draft in 1965. These additional picks are provided when a team loses a particularly valuable free agent in the previous off-season, or, more recently, if a team fails to sign a draft pick from the previous year. The Tigers failed to sign their 1966 first-round pick, Rick Konik, but they received no compensatory pick.

Key

Picks

See also
Detroit Tigers minor league players

Footnotes
 Through the 2012 draft, free agents were evaluated by the Elias Sports Bureau and rated "Type A", "Type B", or not compensation-eligible. If a team offered arbitration to a player but that player refused and subsequently signed with another team, the original team was able to receive additional draft picks. If a "Type A" free agent left in this way, his previous team received a supplemental pick and a compensatory pick from the team with which he signed. If a "Type B" free agent left in this way, his previous team received only a supplemental pick. Since the 2013 draft, free agents are no longer classified by type; instead, compensatory picks are only awarded if the team offered its free agent a contract worth at least the average of the 125 current richest MLB contracts. However, if the free agent's last team acquired the player in a trade during the last year of his contract, it is ineligible to receive compensatory picks for that player.
The Tigers gained a compensatory first-round pick in 1979 from the Milwaukee Brewers as compensation for losing free agent Jim Slaton.
The Tigers lost their first-round pick in 1984 to the San Francisco Giants as compensation for signing free agent Darrell Evans.
The Tigers gained a compensatory first-round pick in 1987 from the Philadelphia Phillies for losing free agent Lance Parrish.
The Tigers gained a supplemental first-round pick in 1987 for losing free agent Lance Parrish.
The Tigers lost their initial first-round pick in 1991 to the Milwaukee Brewers for signing free agent Rob Deer and gained a supplemental first-round pick for losing free agent Jack Morris.
The Tigers gained a supplemental first-round pick in 1991 for losing free agent Mike Heath.
The Tigers gained a supplemental first-round pick in 1998 for losing free agent Willie Blair.
The Tigers gained a supplemental first-round pick in 2001 for losing free agent Juan González.
The Tigers gained a supplemental first-round pick in 2007 for losing free agent Jamie Walker.
The Tigers lost their initial first-round pick in 2010 to the Houston Astros for signing free agent José Valverde and gained a supplemental first-round pick for losing free agent Brandon Lyon.
The Tigers gained a supplemental first-round pick in 2010 for losing free agent Iván Rodríguez.
The Tigers gained a supplemental first-round pick in 2010 for losing free agent Fernando Rodney.
The Tigers lost their first-round pick in 2011 to the Boston Red Sox as compensation for signing free agent Víctor Martínez.
The Tigers lost their first-round pick in 2012 to the Milwaukee Brewers as compensation for signing free agent Prince Fielder.
The Marlins gained an extra first-round pick in 2013 as a result of the 2012 Competitive Balance Lottery and the Tigers traded for that pick. 
The Tigers gained a supplemental first-round pick in 2015 for losing free agent Max Scherzer.

References
General references

In-text citations

First-round draft picks
Major League Baseball first-round draft picks